Biet or BIET may refer to:
 Biet (mountain), a mountain in Switzerland
 Bapuji Institute of Engineering & Technology, Davangere, Karnataka, India
 Bundelkhand Institute of Engineering & Technology, Jhansi, Uttar Pradesh, India

People with the name 
 Christian Biet (1952–2020), French theatrical scholar
 Félix Biet (1838–1901), French missionary
 Michel Biet (1883–1948), Dutch gymnast

See also 
 Beit